Mo Foster (born Michael Ralph Foster, 22 December 1944) is an English multi-instrumentalist, record producer, composer, solo artist, author, and public speaker. Through a career spanning over half a century, Foster has toured, recorded, and performed with dozens of artists, including Jeff Beck, Gil Evans, Phil Collins, Ringo Starr, Joan Armatrading, Gerry Rafferty, Brian May, Scott Walker, Frida of ABBA, Cliff Richard, George Martin, Van Morrison, Dr John, Hank Marvin, Heaven 17 and the London Symphony Orchestra. He has released several albums under his own name, authored a humorous book on the history of British rock guitar, written numerous articles for music publications, continued to compose production music, and established himself as a public speaker. Foster is an assessor for JAMES, an industry organisation that gives accreditation to music colleges throughout the UK. In 2014, Foster was a recipient of a BASCA Gold Badge Award to honour his lifelong contribution to the British songwriting and composing community.

Early years
Mo Foster grew up in the post-war environment of Wolverhampton, a large town in the industrial English West Midlands. Although not having any music in the home, he picked up the recorder at school when he was about nine years old and taught himself.

When he graduated from his primary school in Wolverhampton to the grammar school in the village of Brewood, Staffordshire, there was no music department. He could study Latin, art, science, english, mathematics, and agriculture – but not music.

In 1959, Foster and a group of school friends formed a band called The Tradewinds. Their repertoire initially consisted of American guitar instrumentals, skiffle, and excerpts from The Goon Show.

The band needed a bass-player, so Foster set out to convert a cheap acoustic guitar into a bass guitar. The pickup consisted of two ex-military headphones squeezed into a transparent plastic soap-dish, which was then connected by TV aerial cable to a socket marked "gram" at the back of his Dad’s large Murphy radio. It worked, but failed to impress his friends.

In June 1959, the ban on the import of American musical instruments into the UK, which had been introduced by the British Board of Trade in 1951, was lifted and such instruments (notably Fender and Gibson guitars) became available soon after that. Foster had become a fan of the bass playing of Jet Harris of The Shadows, but had not seen the actual instrument until 1961, when Jet was revealed casually caressing the iconic headstock of a Fender Precision Bass on the cover of The Shadows LP. Foster wanted one, but had to settle for a Dallas Tuxedo Bass, the solitary bass guitar hanging in the window of the local music shop, the Band Box.

In the early 1960s, there were no college music courses available for electric instruments, so Foster followed a scientific path, electing to study physics and mathematics at the University of Sussex. But the university’s pop band, The Baskervilles, and later the University of Sussex Jazz Trio (known as the US Jazz Trio), needed a drummer. So Foster set aside his bass, and for the next three years he played drums at university dances and balls, supporting major acts such as Cream, Georgie Fame and the Blue Flames, The Who, The Graham Bond Organisation, The Zombies, Jimi Hendrix, The Moody Blues, Pink Floyd, and Steampacket with Rod Stewart, Long John Baldry, Julie Driscoll and Brian Auger.

Foster's first professional success came in 1968, when the US Jazz Trio morphed into the progressive jazz/rock band, Affinity, with singer Linda Hoyle, Hammond organist Lynton Naiff, guitarist Mike Jopp, drummer Grant Serpell, and Foster, now back on bass guitar. Affinity played numerous London gigs and radio sessions, attracting the attention of jazz club impresario, Ronnie Scott, who became their manager. Scott secured a record deal with Vertigo Records who chose John Anthony, who had produced albums for Genesis, Queen and Roxy Music, to produce their one, eponymous album. Led Zeppelin's John Paul Jones wrote brass and string arrangements for the collection of self-penned tracks and cover-versions. The album was released in 1970, to a strong reception from the press and broadcasters. However, despite television appearances, and concerts across Europe, the album didn’t sell well, and Linda Hoyle chose not to continue in music. Soon after, the band dissolved, leaving Foster to seek employment as a freelance bass guitarist.

Session years
After Affinity played their last gig in 1970 Foster decided that rather than being an over-educated but unemployed musician he needed to join another band. He placed a classified ad in Melody Maker magazine stating "Bass Guitarist: ex-name group, wishes to join established Family/Colosseum/Traffic type group". He expected no response, but a music producer called Christos Demetriou (i.e. Chris Demetriou) unexpectedly called and offered him a job with ex-Manfred Mann singer Mike d'Abo's band. After touring with the band both in the US and in the UK, Foster's name started to get around. In 1971 he was hired to do a studio session for a Russ Ballard song, "Can't Let You Go" at Lansdowne Studios. "I knew nothing and turned up with a flask and sandwiches because I didn't know how long I'd be there for. There was Clem Cattini on drums, Ray Cooper on percussion, Mike Moran on keyboards, Ray Fenwick on guitar, all fine players and nice guys who thought my naiveté was amusing! That was the beginning of a word of mouth situation which gradually mushroomed." The European disco scene was growing and session work was increasing and Foster was hired to play on a lot of the popular hits of the time including Jimmy Helms' "Gonna Make You an Offer You Can't Refuse" and Cerrone's hit "Supernature".

In his early days as a session player Foster, having been self-taught, could not read music and freely admits that he bluffed his way through a lot of sessions. Finally at a session at Abbey Road Studios, playing with the Royal Philharmonic Orchestra, it got so difficult to follow the music by listening to the drummer and guitarist that he vowed to teach himself. This he then did.

As a session musician Foster claims he has played on over 350 recordings including artists as varied as:

As a sideman Foster has toured the world or played concerts with:

During his time as a session player, Foster was asked to work on many film soundtrack sessions including:

Film
For Your Eyes Only
Octopussy
Revenge of the Pink Panther
Clockwise
Heaven's Prisoners
Lost and Found
Billy the Kid and the Green Baize Vampire
Silver Dream Racer

TV
"Minder"
"Bergerac"
"Grafters"
"Stay Lucky"
"Dangerfield"
"The Last Salute"
"Peak Practice"

In 1975 Foster pioneered the teaching of bass guitar in Britain by founding the first-ever course at Goldsmiths College, University of London. As of mid-2007, along with guitarist Ray Russell and drummer Ralph Salmins, Foster is embarking on several music seminars at different educational establishments around the UK, the most recent (September 2007) being held at Leeds Metropolitan University. The trio have also been invited to give a similar seminar at the famous Liverpool Institute for Performing Arts music school which was started by Sir Paul McCartney. He has also contributed several articles to bass playing specialist magazines.

One of Foster's most memorable bass lines was in the theme tune to the late-70s UK TV show "Minder" starring Dennis Waterman. The tune, "I Can Be So Good For You" started out life as a track on Waterman's solo album, it was then re-jigged as the show's theme tune. He achieved the atypical bass sound by using an unusual bass slap technique on an aluminium Kramer 650B bass guitar.

Foster has cited several well known bassists as being the inspirations to both his playing and his compositions, including Carol Kaye, Jet Harris, Jack Bruce and Stanley Clarke.

Jazz years
In the mid to late 80s Foster was the 'M' in the jazz/rock trio called RMS with fellow session musos, Ray Russell and Simon Phillips. They released (originally on Peter Van Hooke's then at the time fledgling MMC record label) an album called Centennial Park which was remastered and re-released in 2002 on the Angel Air record label. This in turn prompted the release of a live album from 1982 that had never been heard publicly before RMS: Live at the Venue, 1982.

As a result of the success of these two CD releases, a DVD (which featured guests appearances by Gil Evans and Mark Isham) was released a year later. RMS: Live at the Montreux Jazz Festival, 1983. Both the CDs and DVD were produced by Foster and Ray Russell.

Solo years
In the mid-1980s, Foster joined up with comedy writer/actor Mike Walling to form the core of the imaginary, but tragic RJ Wagsmith Band. Together they wrote a chart topping song for Roger Kitter (aka "The Brat"). They also penned what became one of the few one-hit wonders that never actually made it into the charts. "The Papadum Song" was about two losers who go into an Indian restaurant for a meal after a football match. The song got quite considerable airplay and Walling and Foster appeared together on the BBC children's programmes Blue Peter and Granada TV's Get It Together. Unfortunately there was an industrial dispute at Phonogram Records and no records actually got to the shops.

At the latter end of the 1980s Foster decided that he would like the freedom to perform, produce and record his own music rather than that of someone else. He was able to call on some of his many friends who happened to be some of the UK's foremost session musicians to help him. Since 1987 he has released five solo albums.

Solo albums
 Bel Assis (1988) (featuring Gary Moore and drummer Simon Phillips)
 Southern Reunion (1991) (featuring Gary Moore, Gary Husband and Snail's Pace Slim)
 Time To Think (2002)
 Live at Blues West 14 (2006)
 Belsize Lane: A Collection of Sketches (2007) (Limited Issue)

Producer years
Apart from his five solo albums Foster has produced – or co-produced – albums for Deborah Bonham (The Old Hyde), Dr John (Such A Night), Maggie Bell (Live at the Rainbow), Affinity (Live Instrumentals 1969, 1971–72, Origins 1965–67, and Origins Baskervilles 1965), Survivors (Survivors), Maria Muldaur (Live in London), Adrian Legg (Fretmelt), RMS (Centennial Park, Live at the Venue 1982), RMS with Gil Evans (Live at the Montreux Jazz Festival 1983 DVD), The RJ Wagsmith Band (Make Tea Not War).

In addition Foster has composed and produced hundreds of titles for the major Production Music Libraries, co-wrote with Ray Russell the instrumental "So Far Away" for Gary Moore, co-wrote with Mike Walling the comedy hit single "Chalk Dust" for The Brat, co-wrote with Kim Goody the song "Sentimental Again" which reached the final in the Song for Europe Contest in 1990, and co-wrote with Ringo Starr, Joe Walsh, and Kim Goody the main song "In My Car" from Ringo's album Old Wave.

Author years
In 1997 Foster authored a semi-autobiographical and anecdotal book about the birth and rise of Rock guitar in the UK during the period 1955 – 1975.

The book's title is Seventeen Watts?, the title having arisen from the school band member's quandary of "do we really need that much power?" when a 17W Watkins Dominator Amplifier was acquired as a replacement for the 'aging' 5W amp they had previously been using. The US edition of the book was entitled Play Like Elvis and had a different foreword, this time written by Duane Eddy.

The first half of the book covers the emergence of a new breed of the rock guitarist. It features many anecdotes describing the efforts of now prominent guitarists to not only learn chords but to work out how to build their own guitar because they could not afford the ones in the music shop window. There are stories and quotes from guitarists such as Jeff Beck, Ritchie Blackmore, Joe Brown, Clem Cattini, Eric Clapton, Lonnie Donegan, Vic Flick, Herbie Flowers, Roger Glover, George Harrison, Mark Knopfler, Hank Marvin, Brian May, Gary Moore, Joe Moretti, Pino Palladino, Rick Parfitt, John Paul Jones, Francis Rossi, Gerry Rafferty, Mike Rutherford, Big Jim Sullivan, Andy Summers, Richard Thompson, Bert Weedon, Bruce Welch, and Muff Winwood.

The second half of Seventeen Watts? is devoted to the rise and eventual demise of the London studio session scene. Foster seeks to present an insider's view of this creative world, and to convey a sense of the absurdist flavour of musicians' humour.

Non-muso years
Most recently Foster has worked as an archivist/interviewer on the recent UK Channel 4 series Live From Abbey Road, which involved interviewing musicians and bands who were performing live sets at EMI's world-famous Abbey Road Studios.

Foster now concentrates on producing albums for others, composing music, session work (he recently played with Brian May and Brian Bennett on a 12-hour session at Abbey Road Studios for a re-make of Cliff Richard's 1958 hit "Move It"), writing, researching and remastering his back catalogue (not only for his solo projects but also for other artists).

Foster also resumed playing concerts with his band RMS, featuring Ray Russell, and Gary Husband – notably with Gary Moore at a charity concert Vibes From The Vines.

In April 2012, he performed at the Jet Harris Heritage Foundation tribute lunch with The Shadowers and Daniel Martin on Nivram and Diamonds

Influences 
The bass-players who have influenced Foster include:

Selected discography 
Foster has played on hundreds of commercially released recordings and soundtracks. The lists below represent only a small fraction of his recorded performances.

Albums

Hit singles

Awards 
On 14 October 2014, Foster was presented with a BASCA Gold Badge Award in recognition of his unique contribution to music.

Personal life 
Mo Foster lives in London, with his wife, Kay.

See also 
 University of Sussex
 Abbey Road Studios
 AIR Studios

References

External links
 Mo Foster's website
 
 

Living people
English rock bass guitarists
English bass guitarists
English male guitarists
Male bass guitarists
English session musicians
Alumni of the University of Sussex
Academics of Goldsmiths, University of London
People from South Staffordshire District
Michael Schenker Group members
RMS (band) members
Affinity (band) members
1944 births